The Boland Stadium is a stadium in Wellington, Western Cape, South Africa with a capacity of about 11,000 spectators.

It is used mostly for rugby union matches by the Boland Cavaliers team in the Currie Cup.

The ground also played host to a Super Rugby match in 1998, when the Western Stormers defeated the Waratahs 35–33. Boland also defeated the Stormers at the venue in a pre-season match in the lead up to the 2014 Super Rugby season.

References

Rugby union stadiums in South Africa